Enthoven is a surname. Notable people with the surname include:

Alain Enthoven (born 1930), American economist
Dick Enthoven (1937–2022), South African billionaire businessman
Gabrielle Enthoven (1868–1950), English playwright and actress
Geoffrey Enthoven (born 1974), Belgian film director
Henry Enthoven (1855–?), English rugby player
Patrick Enthoven (born 1943/44), South African businessman
Jean-Paul Enthoven (born 1949), French journalist, father of Raphaël
Raphaël Enthoven (born 1975), French philosopher
Reginald Edward Enthoven (1869–1952), British administrator in India
Robby Enthoven (born 1968), South African businessman
Sam Enthoven (born 1974), English children's author
Tommy Enthoven (1903–1975), English cricket player